Hrishikesh Sulabh (born 15 February 1955) is a Hindi writer. He is the recipient of the prestigious 2019 Sangeet Natak Akademi Award. He is best known for writing short stories, and writing plays in Bideshiya Shaili. He worked with the All India Radio between 1980 and 2015. He is now retired and focuses on writing and interacting with young writers / poets / theater workers and activists. He divides his time between his home at Patna and various cities where his children and grandchildren live.

Recent
Hrishikesh Sulabh is awarded the 2019 Sangeet Natak Akademi Award, announced in 2022, for a lifetime of contribution to playwriting and theatre criticism. 
Sulabh's latest novel titled "Daataa Peer" (दाता पीर) has just been published by Rajkamal Prakashan. || 2022
Sulabh's novel titled "Agnileek" (अग्निलीक) has just been published by Rajkamal Prakashan. || Nov 2019
His latest short-story collection "Sankalit Kahaniya" (संकलित कहानियाँ) has been published by National Book Trust (राष्ट्रीय पुस्तक न्यास). || Nov 2019
His representative short story collection has been published in the nationally reputed series "Pratinidhi Kahaniya" published by Rajkamal Prakashan || Feb 2018

Life
Hrishikesh "Sulabh" was born in a small village (of Laheji, in district of Siwan, Bihar). He received his basic schooling in the village school at Laheji. 
The ambience of village stage and theatre led to the inculcation of theatrical values in him.

His father, who was a freedom fighter, moved to the city of Patna for Sulabh's further education. After completing his B.A. in Hindi, he went to pursue his master's degree in the same subject. Due to financial constraints and family responsibilities, he had to drop out after a year of his M.A. education.

As an optimisation between arranging his wherewithal and channelising his creative energies, he took up a job with All India Radio as an executive.

He married Meena Shrivastava on 26 April 1982 at the age of 28. At that time, she was the only graduate in her village (of Madhavpur, in district of Champaran, Bihar). He has three daughters, Vatsala, Vasundhara, and Vallari.

His life and works have been greatly influenced by his father, Dr. Rama Shankar Srivastava (Prasad), who was a homoeopathic doctor and a freedom fighter. Sulabh has been known for crediting his father for being exceptionally understanding. He mentions the freedom and faith extended by his father towards himself as the biggest motivating factors in the journey of his life.
For the past three decades, Hrishikesh Sulabh, apart from writing plays and being a theatre activist, has been actively participating in the various cultural movements.
His stories have been published in a plethora of magazines and at the same time, they have been translated into various languages, also in English. 
On account of his intense passion for theatre, he looked up towards writing plays along with story writing. 
″Hrishikesh Sulabh″ has incorporated the theatrical skills and ideas of the famous drama style of ″Bhikhari Thakur″ .i.e. Bidesiya″ in his plays for the first time in a very creative style for the contemporary Hindi theatre. 
″National School of Drama″ staged his play ″Batohi″. 
For the past few years he has been continuously writing for the literary magazine 'Kathadesh'.

″Dharti Aaba″ and Rani ka Sapna are Hrishikesh Sulabh's latest play.

Awards
2019 Sangeet Natak Akademi Award, announced in 2022 
 2022 katha kram samman 
 10th Indu Sharma International Katha Samman 2010 by Katha UK
 Banarsi Prasad 'Bhojpuri' samman for short story writing in Hindi
 Anil Kumar Mukharji shikhar samman for theatre activities and play writing
 Ramvriksh Benipuri samman for play writing
 Pataliputra award for play writing and theatre
 Siddhnath Kumar smriti samman for play writing and theatre criticism
  1st shashibhooshan smriti samman for play writing

Work
His works can be broadly classified into three categories – plays, short stories, and theatre criticism.

Novels
 Daataa Peer (novel) दाता पीर()
 Agnileek (novel) अग्निलीक (debut novel)

Plays
 Amli अमली
 Batohi बटोही
 Dharti Aaba धरती आबा
 Daaliya दालिया (based on a story by Rabindranath Tagore)
 Mati Gadi माटी गाडी (Adaption of Mrichchakatikam, a Sanskrit play written by Shudrak)
 Maila Aanchal मैला आँचल (Adaptation of a novel by Phanishwar Nath 'Renu')

Short story collections
 Sankalit Kahaniyan  संकलित कहानियाँ
 Pratinidhi Kahaniyan प्रतिनिधि कहानियाँ 
 Halant हलंत
 Pattharkat पथरकट
 Vadhsthal se chalang वधस्थल से छ्लाँग
 Bandha Hai Kaal बँधा है काल
 Tuti Ki Aawaz तूती की आवाज़
 Vasant ke Hatyare वसंत के हत्यारे

Theatre criticism
 Rang Manch Ka Jantantra -a book of theatre criticism रँगमंच का जनतंत्र (collection of Sulabh's article on theatre)
 Regular column on theatre activities in KATHADESH, a Hindi monthly
 Regular column on theatre for a while in Hindi news magazine Lokayat
 Articles in various other newspapers and magazines Jagaran, Dainik Hindustan, Rashtriya Sahara
 Shabdankan (शब्दांकन)
 Sarika
 Dharmyug
 Lahar
 Sakshatkar
 Kathayatra
 Ravivar
 Vasudha
 Samya
 Ab kahani visheshank
 Vartman Sahity
 Hans
 Kathan
 Sabrang-Jansatta visheshank
 Kathadesh
 India Today and Sahity visheshank of India Today
 Lokmat visheshank
 Prabhat Khabar visheshank
 Sambhav kahani visheshank
 Janpath
 Samkaleen Bhartiya Sahitya and others

His story Ashtabhujalal ki Bhujaein/ अष्ठभुजालाल की भुजाएँ (known after translation as Ashtabhujalalinte Bhujangal) was included in Theranjedutha Hindi Kathakal (translated and edited by V. K. Ravindranath)

Interviews
Interview with online newspaper Navjivan India

References

1955 births
Hindi-language writers
Indian male dramatists and playwrights
Indian male short story writers
Indian theatre critics
Living people
Patna University alumni
Writers from Patna
20th-century Indian short story writers
Dramatists and playwrights from Bihar
20th-century Indian male writers
Recipients of the Sangeet Natak Akademi Award